is a Japanese word meaning "a moment; an instant". The word came from a Buddhist term meaning "split second," which was imported from the Chinese language but originated in India (Sanskrit: क्षण, ksana). It can also be used as a given name as-is or with different kanji.

Fictional characters

Setsuna Sanzenkai, the protagonist of Island (video game).
Setsuna F. Seiei, the main protagonist of Mobile Suit Gundam 00.
Setsuna (The Last Blade), a character in the fighting game series The Last Blade.
Setsuna Tokage, a character in My Hero Academia.
Setsuna (real name Ren Fuji), the protagonist in the Dies Irae visual novel and anime series. Later, he becomes an antagonist in Kaijiri Kamui Kagura, a sequel.
Setsuna Meioh (also known as Sailor Pluto, Sailor Guardian of Space-Time), a supporting character in Sailor Moon manga and anime series.
Setsuna Sakurazaki, a character in the Negima!: Magister Negi Magi manga and anime series.
Setsuna Mudou, a character in Angel Sanctuary manga and anime series.
Setsuna no Takemaru, a character in the film Inuyasha the Movie: Swords of an Honorable Ruler.
Setsuna Oomido, a character in the Grenadier (manga) and anime series.
Setsuna Saizuki, a character in the Evil Zone/Eretzvaju video game.
Setsuna Kiyoura, a character in the Summer Days visual novel and School Days video game and anime.
Setsuna Yagami, a character in the Battle Raper 2 3D H-game.
Setsuna, a dragon in Flame of Recca.
Setsuna Honjou, a character in the Majin Tantei Nogami Neuro manga and anime series.
Setsuna, an antagonist from the Needless manga and anime series.
Setsuna Ran, triplet leaders of the Ran Clan from Saiunkoku Monogatari.
Setsuna Higashi, Eas/Cure Passion from Fresh Pretty Cure!.
Setsuna, a character in Fire Emblem Fates.
Setsuna, one of three protagonist in the anime television series Yashahime: Princess Half-Demon.
Setsuna, the title character of the video game I Am Setsuna.
"Kurokiri" Setsuna, an antagonist from the manga Buster Keel.
, a character in Love Live! Nijigasaki High School Idol Club.
Setsuna Kiryu, a character from Kengan Ashura.
Setsuna Ogiso, a heroine character in White Album 2.
Setsuna, a character from Shattered Angels.

Music
Setsuna, a 2003 album by Kenji Ozawa.
"Setsuna," a song by Greeeen.
"SETSUNA DROP", a song by Shouta Aoi.
"Setsuna Drive" by 9mm Parabellum Bullet, sung by IA

Vehicles
Toyota Setsuna
Toyota Camatte Setsuna

References

Japanese unisex given names